Words of Radiance is an epic fantasy novel written by American author Brandon Sanderson and the second book in The Stormlight Archive series. The novel was published on March 4, 2014, by Tor Books. Words of Radiance consists of one prologue, 89 chapters, an epilogue and 14 interludes. It is preceded by The Way of Kings and followed by Oathbringer.

In 2015, it won the David Gemmell Legend Award for best novel. The unabridged audiobook is read by narrator team Michael Kramer and Kate Reading.

Development
The release of the book was delayed due to Sanderson's commitment to writing the final book of The Wheel of Time.

Initially, Sanderson planned that this volume would be named after the tome Shallan is given at the end of the first volume: The Book of Endless Pages. However, the name was changed after the editor commented "Uh, are you sure you want to name a very long, very thick fantasy book The Book of Endless Pages?” The book, at 1088 pages, was the maximum printable size of a book for its publisher, Tor Books, making it the biggest book printed by the company up to that point.

On July 1, 2013, Sanderson announced on his official Twitter account that he had finished the first draft of Words of Radiance. On July 3 Tor Books officially released an early excerpt of the novel, containing the beginning of an interlude starring Taravangian, the King of Kharbranth. On December 10, 2013, Tor Books announced on its official website that Sanderson had turned in the manuscript of the book, commenting that production could now begin. On the same day a second excerpt of the novel was released, containing an interlude starring the new character Lift.

On December 30, 2013, Tor Books revealed the endpapers for Words of Radiance, painted by American artist Michael Whelan. It pictures Shallan while painting at the Shattered Plains. In the same article Whelan states, "When Irene Gallo proposed a second painting for Words of Radiance, I immediately knew it was Shallan we were talking about. Indeed, like many fans, I had felt that the story was becoming as much Shallan’s as Kaladin’s; she merited equal representation in the book’s design, as far as it was possible to do so."

On January 8, 2014, Tor Books released the prologue and first two chapters of the book as previews with points-of-view of Jasnah, Shallan and Kaladin. A week later, on January 14, Tor Books released the 3rd, 4th and 5th chapters of the book, followed by the 6th, 8th and 9th chapters on January 21. The last chapters to be released before the publication of the book, Chapters Ten, Twelve, Fourteen and the first Interlude, were released on January 28, 2014.

Tor Books revealed the dates and locations for the Words of Radiance book tour on January 29, 2014. On February 4, 2014, Tor announced 'The Glimpses of Radiance', a series of daily previews of the book running from February 11 to March 4, 2014. Non-spoiler reviews were released by Alice Arneson and Carl Engle-Laird on the Tor website and by 17thshard.com, the official fansite of Brandon Sanderson, 17th Shard calling the book, "truly an achievement. It expands on its predecessor, fulfilling the promises it sets up, and manages to surpass it". Samples of interior art painted by Ben McSweeney and Isaac Stewart were released on February 26.

Plot
Years ago, Szeth-son-son-Vallano, the Assassin in White, was sent by the Parshendi to assassinate the Alethi king Gavilar Kholin (for reasons not yet revealed to the reader).  This murder resulted in the Vengeance Pact among the highprinces of Alethkar and the War of Reckoning against the Parshendi.  Now Szeth is active again, and is sent by King Taravangian of Kharbranth, to kill Highprince Dalinar Kholin (brother of the late King Gavilar).

Kaladin, once a slave and bridgeman on the Shattered Plains, is given command of the royal bodyguards to protect Dalinar and his family (including King Elhokar) from perils and the threat of the Assassin. Meanwhile, he struggles with both his feelings regarding lighteyes (the nobility of the Alethi) and his past with Brightlord Amaram.  He trains and practices to master the powers of a Windrunner that are linked to the bond with his honorspren, Syl.

Shallan Davar, together with her mentor Jasnah Kholin, are heading to the Shattered Plains to prevent the return of the Voidbringers and their civilization-ending Desolation.  Jasnah arranges a marriage between Shallan and Adolin Kholin, Jasnah's cousin.  Their ship is attacked en route to the Shattered Plains and while Shallan survives, Jasnah is believed to be killed. Shallan, with the assistance of sailors and outlaws she finds on the road, makes her arrival at the Shattered Plains.

One of the Parshendi, Venli, discovers a stormform that allows Parshendi to summon a storm similar to the Highstorms and turn the tide of the war. Some Parshendi believe using stormform will summon the Voidbringers, but the ruling council allows the form. Eshonai wants to parlay with Dalinar to bring an end to the war before stormform is used.

Szeth attempts to murder Dalinar but is stopped when Dalinar catches Szeth's shardblade with his hands. Kaladin ends the attempt by knocking himself and Szeth into open air. During the melee after landing, Szeth sees Kaladin use stormlight and flees from the duel, realizing that the Radiants are back and he is not Truthless.

Later, a Bridge Four member named Moash who has a grudge against Elhokar enters a plot to assassinate him. Kaladin gifts him a Shardblade that he and Adolin won in a duel, giving Moash the equipment needed to attain his goal.

Eshonai, along with most of the surviving Parshendi transform to stormform, and summon the Everstorm, which comes from the opposite direction as the normal highstorms.  The Alethi attack and defeat the Parshendi, but not before the storm is summoned. Moash attempts to kill Elhokar, but the attempt is foiled by Kaladin, after which Moash and his fellow conspirators flee. Szeth attacks Dalinar again, but is mortally wounded by Kaladin. He falls from the sky and is presumed dead. The Alethi armies are only able to escape the storms through Shallan's discovery and activation of the Oathgate (a system of teleports usable only by the Radiants), which evacuates the army to the legendary city of the Radiants, Urithiru.

After arriving at Urithiru, Dalinar swears the oaths of the Knights Radiant and the Order of the Bondsmiths - binding the Stormfather as his spren.  It is discovered that Renarin, son of Dalinar, is also a member of the Knights Radiant (a member of the order of Truthwatchers).  Adolin, after being confronted by Sadeas who states that he will continue to oppose Dalinar - despite the desolation - kills Sadeas after a short struggle. Szeth wakes from a coma to discover that Nale, Herald of Justice and leader of the Skybreakers, has healed him before he could truly die of his injuries sustained fighting Kaladin.

In the epilogue, Jasnah is met by Hoid after she returns from the Cognitive Realm, where she escaped to from the attack on her ship to the Shattered Plains.

Viewpoint Characters
The primary chapters within the book are told from the viewpoint of several major characters, while the book's interludes are told from the viewpoint of other characters (not all of which repeat).

Main
 Szeth-son-son-Vallano: An assassin from the land of Shinovar. He refers to himself as a "Truthless" who must serve those who bear his Oathstone. Bearer of an Honorblade which gives him the power to use Stormlight and the abilities of a Windrunner. He hates being forced to murder and weeps as he does.
 Shallan Davar: A minor lighteyes from the nation of Jah Keved. Her family has fallen on hard times after the death of her father. She is the ward and student of renowned scholar Jasnah Kholin. Shallan is a Lightweaver; she is able to, with a single glance, remember and recreate a scene with charcoal and paper and able to Soulcast without a Soulcaster. She travels to the Shattered Plains to learn more about the Voidbringers. She becomes betrothed to Adolin Kholin after Jasnah sets it up as a way to help save House Davar from ruin. She has a spren, named Pattern, accompanying her.
 Kaladin: A darkeyes from the nation of Alethkar who serves as the captain of Dalinar's personal guard, and subsequently the king's Honor Guard. Formerly an apprentice surgeon to his father and member of the army of brightlord Amaram. Kaladin is a Windrunner; he is able to use Stormlight to heal himself and make himself stronger and faster than any normal human being. He is accompanied by an honorspren named Syl.
 Dalinar Kholin: A highprince of Alethkar, brother to the slain King Gavilar, uncle to the current king and Highprince of War. Nicknamed the Blackthorn. A general who helped unite the kingdom with his brother. A man who experiences visions during the highstorms, and a Full Shardbearer, he is criticized as weak because he follows the Codes and talks about stopping the pointless war Alethkar is engaged in. He plans to unify Alethkar and refound the Knights Radiant. Dalinar is revealed to be a Bondsmith at the end of WoR, and his bonded spren is the Stormfather himself, a splinter of the Almighty.
 Adolin Kholin: A lighteyed prince and heir to his father Dalinar's highprince seat. A skilled duelist and a Full Shardbearer, he loves and respects his father. He is betrothed to Shallan Davar.
 Renarin Kholin: The younger son of Evi and Dalinar Kholin, Renarin is also Adolin's younger brother and is revealed to be a Truthwatcher, a type of Surgebinder. He has a spren named Glys. 
 Navani Kholin: Widow of King Gavilar, mother of King Elhokar and Jasnah. She is a skilled artifabrian. She has always loved Dalinar, even when she was married to his brother, Gavilar, and eventually rekindles her relationship with Dalinar.

Interludes
 Jasnah Kholin: the sister to the king of Alethkar and the greatest scholar in the world. She is capable of Soulcasting without a Soulcaster, and is bonded to a spren named Ivory, who gained her the abilities of Stormlight used by the Knights Radiant. She is a member of the Order of Elsecallers, who have the Surges of Transformation and Transportation.
 Eshonai: one of the Listeners, known by the Alethi as Parshendi, and the only Shardbearer among her people. She seeks peace with the armies of the humans.
 Ym: a shoemaker in Iri, bound to an unnamed spren. Once a beggar, he now makes shoes, which he gives to urchins on the street.
 Rysn: a young woman from Thaylenah, an apprentice merchant. She travels with her babsk to the Reshi Isles.
 Zahel: a swordmaster and ardent, training both Adolin and Renarin.
 Taln: known as Talenelat or Stonesinew, he is a Herald of the Almighty, sent to prepare humankind for the Desolation.
 Lift: a Reshi thief who works in Azimir in Azir. She has Surgebinding abilities that corresponded with the Order of Edgedancers.
 Lhan: an ardent in Kholinar. He is lazy and often drunk. He explains 'the easiest job in the world' to a woman called Pai, who - a day later - starts riots in the city.
 Taravangian: the king of Kharbranth. He employed Szeth to kill a great number of leaders around the world, following the Diagram, a masterplan to prepare the world for the Last Desolation, made by himself.
 Wit: also known as Hoid, is the court jester of king Elhokar Kholin at the Shattered Plains.

Reception

Critical response and sales
In its first week of release, Words of Radiance debuted at No. 1 on the New York Times Hardcover Fiction Bestseller list. It also reached No. 1 on the combined print/ebook bestseller list and the Kobo Bestseller list. It was at No. 3 on the National Indie Besteller list, and at No. 6 on the Southern California Independent Bookseller Association bestselling hardcover fiction list. The UK publisher of the book, Gollancz, debuted with Words of Radiance at No. 2 on the Sunday Times of Londen Besteller list.

A review written by Rob Bricken of io9 called the book an old-school, "90s fantasy-style behemoth", also commenting, "While Sanderson continues to build his characters and reveal who they are (especially in the case of Shallan's past) it still clings to one overarching plot that drives relentlessly to an ending that can only be described as 'epic'."

The Lincoln Journal Star called the book "an extremely satisfying read that shows what the beginning of an epic fantasy series should look like."

Awards and nominations

Audiobook
An audiobook version was released by Macmillan Audio on the same day as the hardcover version read by narrator team Kate Reading and Michael Kramer, who also read The Way of Kings. A 5-part GraphicAudio version of Words of Radiance was released from September 2016 to January 2017.

Sequel

The third book in the series, Oathbringer, was released on November 14, 2017.

References

External links
 
 

2014 American novels
The Stormlight Archive
Tor Books books
Books with cover art by Michael Whelan
Novels set on fictional planets